Götz Wolfgang Werner (5 February 1944 – 8 February 2022) was a German billionaire businessman and founder of the dm-drogerie markt retail store chain. He was also known as an advocate of universal basic income (UBI).

In 2013, Manager Magazin estimated his net worth to be around €1.1 billion, making him the 109th-richest German.

Career 
In 1973, Werner co-founded his first drugstore, dm-drogerie markt, a German drugstore chain, in Karlsruhe. By 1978, there were more than 100 branches in Germany. Later he was member of the advisory board of dm. In 1976, Werner expanded into the Austrian market. He led the company for 35 years. From October 2003 till September 2010, he was the head of the Cross-Department Group for Entrepreneurial Studies at the Karlsruhe Institute of Technology. Till 2018 he was president of the EHI Retail Institute (EHI).

Inspired by Rudolf Steiner's teachings of anthroposophy, Werner was one of the most influential advocates of basic income in Germany (1000 Euros for everyone). He founded the initiative Unternimm die Zukunft, or Become an entrepreneur of the future.

Personal life and death
Werner was married twice and had seven children. He died in Stuttgart on 8 February 2022, at the age of 78.

Bibliography
 Einkommen für alle. Der dm-Chef über die Machbarkeit des bedingungslosen Grundeinkommens. Kiepenheuer & Witsch, Köln 2007, .
 with Adrienne Goehler: 1000 € für jeden. Freiheit, Gleichheit, Grundeinkommen. Econ, Berlin 2010, .
 with Claudia Cornelson: Womit ich nie gerechnet habe. Die Autobiographie, Berlin: Ullstein 2013, .
 with Peter Dellbrügger (Hrsg.): Wozu Führung? Dimensionen einer Kunst. KIT Scientific Publishing, Karlsruhe 2013, .

References

External links
 Götz Werner  on the Unternimm die Zukunft website (in German)

1944 births
2022 deaths
21st-century German writers
21st-century German male writers
Anthroposophists
Universal basic income in Germany
Universal basic income writers
Businesspeople from Heidelberg
German male writers
Officers Crosses of the Order of Merit of the Federal Republic of Germany
Recipients of the Order of Merit of Baden-Württemberg
People from the Republic of Baden